Onesmus Kimweli Mutungi (1940–2016) was a Kenyan judge and law professor. He was the first Kenyan ever to get a doctoral degree in law. He was also the first dean of the University of Nairobi School of Law.

References

1940 births
2016 deaths
Kamba people
20th-century Kenyan lawyers
21st-century Kenyan lawyers
Academic staff of the University of Nairobi
Chief justices of Kenya
People from Kitui County